Pescara Calcio a 5 is a futsal club based in Pescara, Abruzzo, Italy. The club was founded in 1999 as "D'Angelantonio C5". In 2003 the denominationation changes in "Pescara Sport Five" and in 2007 it took the current denomination; its indoor arena is PalaRigopiano based in Pescara with 1,500 seaters.

Honours
1  Serie A: 2014/15
2  Coppa Italia: 2016, 2017
2  Supercoppa Italiana: 2015, 2016

Roster 2016/2017

Famous Players

European Champions 
The following players have won the title of European champions to the UEFA Futsal Championship while they were playing in Pescara.

 Sergio Romano (Belgium 2014)
 Luca Leggiero (Belgium 2014)
 Daniel Giasson (Belgium 2014)

World Champions 
The following players have won the title of World champions to the FIFA Futsal World Cup while they were playing in Pescara.

 Leandro Cuzzolino (Colombia 2016)
 Cristian Borruto (Colombia 2016)
 Maximiliano Rescia  (Colombia 2016)

UEFA Club Competitions Record

UEFA Futsal Cup

European competitions record

External links 
 Official Website

Futsal clubs in Italy
Sport in Abruzzo
1999 establishments in Italy
Futsal clubs established in 1999